Regan Newman Slater (born 11 September 1999) is an English professional footballer who plays for Hull City as a midfielder.

Club career
Born in Gleadless, Slater is a graduate of the Sheffield United academy. He further progressed to captain the youth side.

In November 2016, Slater made his first team debut against Grimsby Town; scoring a goal in the 4–2 victory and becoming the youngest footballer to achieve this feat for the club. On 28 December 2016, Slater was promoted to the senior team; penning a deal which would keep him at the club till 2020.
On 16 December 2017, Slater made his league debut, replacing Samir Carruthers in a 1–0 defeat against Preston North End. In January 2018, he made an appearance against Ipswich Town in the FA Cup; where his tackle against Bersant Celina was later said by manager Chris Wilder to be his "personal highlight" of the match.

On 20 July 2018, Slater was loaned out to League Two club Carlisle United on a one-year deal. He scored his first two goals for the club in a 4–0 win over Swindon Town in November 2018.

On 27 July 2019, Slater signed a season-long loan with Scunthorpe United, the same day scoring on his debut in a pre-season friendly against Lincoln City.

On 30 September 2020, Slater signed a season-long loan with Hull City. He made his debut on 3 October 2020 in the home win to Plymouth Argyle. On 27 October 2020, he came off the bench in a triple-substitution, away to Bristol Rovers and scored the second goal for Hull in a 3–1 win.

On 27 January 2022, Slater returned to the Hull City after signing a two-and-a-half-year deal for an undisclosed fee.

Career statistics

Honours 
Hull City

 EFL League One Champions: 2020–21

References

External links

1999 births
Living people
Footballers from Sheffield
English footballers
Association football midfielders
Sheffield United F.C. players
Hull City A.F.C. players
Scunthorpe United F.C. players
Carlisle United F.C. players
English Football League players